Eriosoma is a genus of true bugs belonging to the family Aphididae.

The species of this genus are found in Europe, Australia and Northern America.

Species:
 Eriosoma alabastrum
 Eriosoma americanum (C.V.Riley, 1879) — woolly elm aphid
 Eriosoma anncharlotteae 
 Eriosoma flavum 
 Eriosoma grossulariae 
 Eriosoma lanigerum  (Hausemann, 1802) — woolly apple aphid
 Eriosoma lanuginosum 
 Eriosoma patchiae 
 Eriosoma pyricola  (A.C.Baker & Davidson, 1916) — pear root aphid
 Eriosoma sorbiradicis 
 Eriosoma ulmi'' (L., 1879) — elm-currant aphid

References

Aphididae
Eriosoma (aphid)
Taxa named by William Elford Leach